Edrudia is a fungal genus in the family Lecanoraceae. It is a monotypic genus, containing the single species Edrudia constipans, which is a lichen endemic to the Farallon Islands of California. The genus is named after American botanist and lichenologist Emanuel David Rudolph.

References

Lecanoraceae
Lichen genera
Monotypic Lecanorales genera
Taxa described in 1980